The 2017 LFA Segunda is the second season of the Liga Futebol Amadora Segunda Divisão. The season began on March 7 and was finished in the Final match on September 22.

All Segunda Divisão games are played at the Dili Municipal Stadium and Kampo Demokrasia only used for Final match on September 22.

Cacusan CF is the last season champions and got promoted to 2017 LFA Primeira.

Stadiums
Primary venues used in the 2017 LFA Segunda

Teams
There are 13 teams that will play this season.

from Segunda
Cacusan and FC Zebra promoted to 2017 Primeira Divisao after securing place as champions and runners-up in 2016 Segunda Divisao.

to Segunda
Aitana and DIT F.C. were relegated to 2017 Segunda Divisao after finished 7th and bottom place of 2016 Primeira Divisao.

Locations

Personnel

Foreign players

Restricting the number of foreign players strictly to four per team. A team could use four foreign players on the field each game.

Group A

Group B

Final

Season statistics

See also
 2017 LFA Primeira
 2017 Taça 12 de Novembro
 2017 LFA Super Taça
 2017 LFA Segunda Divisao Promotion Playoff

References

External links
Official website
Official Facebook page

Liga Futebol Amadora
Timor-Leste